NGD may refer to
 Project 18, India's Next Generation Destroyer 
 New Guinea Dingo,  New Guinea Singing Dog
 Non-Good Delivery gold or silver bars
 NGD Studios, a game development company
 NGD-4715, a drug
 New Gibraltar Democracy, a political party
 Newport Gwent Dragons, a Welsh rugby union club
 Auguste George Airport (IATA code NGD)